Silver Lake Film Festival ran from 2000 to 2007.  It was a 501 (c) (3) nonprofit organization established to provide a showcase for cutting-edge independent film, music, digital, and other arts in Los Angeles, California. The Festival was held annually at various venues throughout Los Angeles’ Eastside, showcasing well over 200 narrative features, documentaries and short films.  In 2005, in addition to its annual event, SLFF launched a very successful monthly series of short films with curated programs from an international array of filmmakers that is consistently SRO. The 7th annual edition ran for ten days, May 3–12, 2007, and included such varied programming as MP4Fest and MusicFest (two festivals-within-the-festival), along with curated film programs on architecture and design, urban sustainability, and an ASCAP Music Lounge along the lines of those at Tribeca and Sundance Film Festivals.

Mission 
Silver Lake Film Festival was created specifically to address the lack of opportunity for truly independent films to be seen by audiences in movie theaters. Its mission has been to reflect a personal vision of the filmmaker, rather than a commercial imperative.  Ironically, there had been a dearth of this type of film festival in Los Angeles – the film capital of the world – where the prevailing programs bend to either mainstream studio fare or highly niched markets.  In fact, the majority of films screened at the annual festival would otherwise never be seen by Los Angeles audiences in any context—in theaters, on TV or DVD, etc.

Los Angeles' Eastside

Local history
Silver Lake Film Festival’s name was chosen as emblematic of the entire Eastside community of Los Angeles, roughly that area between Downtown and Hollywood and including the historic communities of Echo Park, Silver Lake and Los Feliz. This area is bounded by major movie studios, including NBC Universal and Paramount Pictures, and is the site of the historic birthplace of cinema in Los Angeles. Since their establishment in the early 20th century, Silver Lake and its surrounding environs have had a reputation for avant-garde arts, a pronounced multiculturalism, a large gay and lesbian community, and staunchly progressive politics.

In this creative environment, Modernist architecture flourished, and the area is filled with many mid-century residential masterpieces by some of the leading lights of Modernist architecture, including Rudolph Schindler, Richard Neutra and John Lautner. In the 1950s the hilly area became known as Red Hills because of all the purported Communists who called it home. Many literary luminaries have also made their homes in Silver Lake, including Raymond Chandler, Anaïs Nin and Charles Bukowski.

Boho Heart
More recently, the Silver Lake area has developed an international reputation for urban bohemianism. Artists and audience-goers gravitate to an area filled with alternative music clubs, one-of-a-kind fashion boutiques, art galleries, record and book stores, and a vast array of ethnic cafes and restaurants – the equivalent of the East Village in New York City or San Francisco’s South of Market district. The area is also becoming known nationally for its thriving alternative music scene, and numerous musicians as well as other artists call it home, including Beck, the Red Hot Chili Peppers and world-famous opera singer Marilyn Horne.

Programming

Along with presenting a large number of new films each year via the open call for submission, Silver Lake Film Festival was known internationally for its array of festivals-within-the-festival, and its curated programs, which presented films grouped according to specialized subjects by experts in their fields.

Festivals within the festival
From its grass roots origins at the Vista Theatre in Silver Lake, the Festival has continued to expand annually, both in the amount of its content and in its range of arts programming.  In its third year (2003), Silver Lake Film Festival launched FringeFest, a fest-within-a-fest committed to presenting the best in experimental and avant-garde video and film, along with presenting live shows of cutting-edge performance artists. In the same year, the Festival introduced MusicFest, a parallel festival showcasing the best of independent, alternative, and progressive musical artists through films and live concerts.

In its sixth year (2006), Silver Lake Film Festival  debuted MP4Fest. ,

Curated by Saskia Wilson-Brown and David Burns, MP4Fest provided another parallel festival devoted exclusively to digital content and, specifically, movies made for viewing online and on handheld devices, such as cellphones, PDAs and game players. The inaugural program was marked by the first public screening of Machinima in Los Angeles.

Curated programs
Silver Lake Film Festival’s many curated programs have included the following: “Reel Politik”, a series of documentaries that demonstrated the power of cinema to influence social change, called agitprop; “New Croatian Cinema”, curated by Ziggy Mkrich, festival director of the Dubrovnik International Film Festival, and underwritten by the Croatian Ministry of Culture; a tribute to revolutionary spirit Tina Modotti; “Green Films,” a slate of environmental documentaries whose executive curator was Los Angeles City Council President Eric Garcetti; “State of the Union,” films on the changing labor movement; and an extensive Fusion Asian cinema program, which presented a retrospective of legendary Japanese horror master Nobuo Nakagawa and award-winning films from festivals in Korea, Hong Kong and India.

Cinema heritage

Annually at every festival, Silver Lake Film Festival has paid tribute to the founding forces of cinema — fitting, since the Edendale neighborhood, between Silver Lake and Echo Park, is where the first Hollywood studios took root.  Among those whose work has been spotlighted are Antonio Moreno, Clara Bow, Baby Peggy, Fatty Arbuckle, and Sessue Hayakawa. The Festival also looks to the present and future, bestowing its Spirit of Silver Lake Award for career achievement in independent cinema on such notables as actors John C. Reilly, Laura Dern, Mark Ruffalo, and Julie Delpy, and filmmakers Allison Anders, Charles Burnett, Kenneth Anger, Rob Nilsson, Curtis Harrington and Penelope Spheeris

Venues
For the first four years, the Festival was based at the historic Vista Theatre at the corner of Hollywood and Sunset Boulevards—the longest-running freestanding theater in Southern California—and included additional venues in neighboring theaters.  In 2005 and 2006, the Festival took place exclusively at the ArcLight Cinemas in Hollywood, a high-profile complex that allowed increased media visibility for its programs.  In 2007, Silver Lake Film Festival’s co-directors Kate Marciniak, Greg Ptacek and Saskia Wilson-Brown announced that the heart of the Festival would return to its namesake neighborhood, capitalizing on the resurgence of Silver Lake and Echo Park as entertainment and nightlife loci of note—perfectly reflecting the Festival’s philosophical and pragmatic independence.

Key people

Greg Ptacek
Roger Mayer
Kate Marciniak
Saskia Wilson-Brown
David Andrusia
Henry K. Priest
Charles Belk
Bianca Bezdek
Carlos Blumberg De Menezes
Tiffany Naiman
Jenna Didier
Jason Dollar
P. David Ebersole
Ann Friday
Vinny Gajee
JoAnn Hanley
Kelly Hargraves
Oliver Hess
Linda Huynh
Bob Johnson
Howie Klein
Mary Ledding

See also
Films featured
Mad Cowgirl
The Oates' Valor

External links

 Silver Lake Film Festival Official Website, at the Internet Archive from the original.
 Los Angeles Times article 7/26/06 on Silver Lake

Film festivals in Los Angeles
Digital film festivals